Ramaswami Mudaliar or Ramaswamy Mudaliar may refer to:

 Arcot Ramasamy Mudaliar (1887–1976), Indian lawyer, politician and statesman
 S. Ramaswami Mudaliar (1840–1911), Indian merchant, dubash, politician and philanthropist
 Salem Ramaswami Mudaliar (1852–1892), Indian lawyer, politician and independence activist
 V. K. Ramaswami Mudaliar, Indian politician, former Member of the Legislative Assembly of Tamil Nadu